Carlos Loveira (1882-1928) was a Cuban journalist and naturalistic author.

Biography
Carlos Loveira was a journalist and naturalistic author born in Santa Clara, Cuba. Loveira was orphaned at age nine and moved to New York with his mother's family in 1895. He returned to Cuba in 1898 to fight for the country's independence from Spain, and worked as an interpreter for American troops stationed in Cuba during the U.S. occupation.

An anarchist, Loveira was heavily involved in the Cuban socialist and labor movements. After working in the railroad industry throughout Latin America from 1903, he founded the Liga Cubana de Empleados de Ferrocarriles in 1910 and the newspaper El Ferrocarrilero (1909-1911). He moved from Camagüey to Sagua La Grande after the union failed. Loveira also founded the short-lived newspaper Gente Nueva and the magazine Cauterios.

Exiled to Mexico in 1913, the author spent the remainder of his life traveling between Mexico, Cuba and the United States working as a labor organizer and lobbyist consulting with the United Nations.

His novels include Los inmorales (1910), Generales y doctores (1920), Los ciegos (1922), La última lección (1924) and Juan Criollo (1927).

Works or publications

Notes and references

Further reading

External links
 The Carlos Loveira collection is available at the Cuban Heritage Collection, University of Miami Libraries. The Carlos Loveira Collection contains manuscripts, clippings, photographs, and written documents.

1882 births
1928 deaths
Cuban journalists
Male journalists
Cuban exiles
Cuban male writers
20th-century journalists